John II of Isenburg-Wied was the co-Count of Isenburg-Wied from 1415 until 1454.

House of Isenburg